Steven Edward Brooks (born June 2, 1971) is a former American football tight end who played for the Detroit Lions in the National Football League (NFL). He played college football at Occidental College.

References

Further reading

1971 births
Living people
American football tight ends
Occidental Tigers football players
Detroit Lions players